Aleksandar Mršević (born 25 July 1996) is a Serbian football defender. His primary position is centre-back, but he also can perform as a full-back.

Career
Mršević passed the youth school of FK Partizan. He joined Radnički Niš in 2014, but 2014–15 season he spent as a loaned player in Sinđelić Niš. He made his SuperLiga in away win against OFK Beograd in 17th fixture of 2015–16 Serbian SuperLiga season, when he started match as a right-back, but he made a penalty on the opponent player and got the yellow card, so he was substituted out at the beginning of second half.

References

External links
 
 Aleksandar Mršević stats at utakmica.rs 
 

1996 births
Living people
Association football defenders
Serbian footballers
FK Sinđelić Niš players
FK Radnički Niš players
Serbian SuperLiga players